A coal truck may refer to:

 Bathtub gondola, a type of railway gondola
 Chaldron wagon
 Dumper
 Dump truck
 Haul truck
 Hopper car
 Mine car
 Minecart
 Mineral wagon
 Open wagon

See also 
 Coal haul truck (disambiguation)